The Madhya Pradesh cricket team formerly known as Holkar cricket team, is a domestic cricket team based in the Indian state of Madhya Pradesh. It competes in the Ranji Trophy.

History

Holkar cricket team 

A Central India team competed in the Ranji Trophy between 1934–35 and 1939–40, playing 12 matches. In 1941, Holkar entered the competition, organised and managed by King Yashwantrao Holkar II belonging to the Holkar dynasty of the Marathas. In the fourteen years of its existence Holkar, which included such players as C. K. Nayudu and Mushtaq Ali, won the title four times and finished second on six other occasions. 
Another Ranji Trophy team later to be absorbed by Madhya Pradesh was Gwalior (one match in 1943-44).

Madhya Pradesh team 

Madhya Pradesh began competing as a team from 1950-51. Holkar appeared in the Ranji Trophy till 1954-55 after which it was dissolved and replaced by a Madhya Bharat team. This became part of the Madhya Pradesh team after two years as the states were reorganised.

Madhya Pradesh's first title was the 1998-99 Wills Trophy, where they defeated Bengal in the final. Madhya Pradesh team reached the final of the Ranji Trophy for the first time in the same season. They took the first innings lead against Karnataka and needed only a draw to win the title but collapsed in the final session of the last day to lose with five overs to spare.

Finally in the 2021–22 season, Madhya Pradesh defeated the 41-time Champions Mumbai in the final in Bengaluru to win the Ranji Trophy for the fifth time and first time as Madhya Pradesh.

Honours

Holkar

 Ranji Trophy
 Winners (4): 1945–46, 1947–48, 1950–51, 1952–53
 Runners-up (6): 1944–45, 1946–47, 1949–50, 1951–52, 1953–54, 1954–55

Madhya Pradesh

 Ranji Trophy
 Winners: 2021–22
 Runners-up: 1998–99

 Wills Trophy
 Winners: 1998–99

 Syed Mushtaq Ali Trophy
 Runners-up: 2010-11

Famous players
Players from Holkar and Madhya Pradesh who have played Test cricket for India, along with year of Test debut:
 Cottari Kanakaiya Nayudu (1932)
 Janardan Navle (1932)
 Cottari Subbanna Nayudu (1934)
 Syed Mushtaq Ali (1934)
 Chandu Sarwate (1946)
 Hiralal Gaekwad (1952) 
 Narendra Hirwani (1988)
 Rajesh Chauhan (1993)
 Naman Ojha (2015)

Players from Madhya Pradesh who have played ODI but not Test cricket for India, along with year of ODI debut:
 Amay Khurasiya (1999)
 Kuldeep Sen (2022)

Cricketers from other state teams who also played for Madhya Pradesh, and played Test cricket for India, along with year of Test debut:
 Khanderao Rangnekar (1947)
 Chandrakant Pandit (1986)

Cricketers from other state teams who also played for Madhya Pradesh, and played ODI but not Test cricket for India, along with year of ODI debut:
 Jai Prakash Yadav (2002)

Notable players at the domestic level:
 Bhausaheb Nimbalkar
 Narayan Nivsarkar
 Devendra Bundela 
 Ishwar Pandey 
 Jalaj Saxena
 Rajat Patidar

Current squad 
Players with international caps are listed in bold.

Updated as on 1 March 2023

Coaching staff
Coaching staff for team are listed below:
 Head Coach: Chandrakant Pandit
 Trainer: Mayank Agarwal
 Physio: Balasaheb Tate

Former players
List of Madhya Pradesh first-class players
List of Madhya Pradesh List A players
List of Madhya Pradesh Twenty20 players

Records
For more details on this topic, see List of Madhya Pradesh first-class cricket records, List of Madhya Pradesh List A cricket records, List of Madhya Pradesh Twenty20 cricket records.

Grounds

Holkar Stadium
Madhya Pradesh play the majority of their home matches at the Holkar Stadium.

Captain Roop Singh Stadium
Madhya Pradesh's second home is Captain Roop Singh Stadium in Gwalior

Other grounds

References

Indian first-class cricket teams
Cricket in Madhya Pradesh
1950 establishments in India
Cricket clubs established in 1950